Elizabeth of Denmark, Norway, and Sweden (24 June 1485 – 10 June 1555) was a Scandinavian princess who became Electress of Brandenburg as the spouse of Joachim I Nestor, Elector of Brandenburg. She was the daughter of King Hans of Denmark, Norway and Sweden and his spouse, Christina of Saxony.

Biography 

As a child, Elizabeth had a close relation with her brother, the later King Christian II of Denmark. She was able to read and write in both Danish and German. On 10 April 1502 she married Joachim I Nestor, Elector of Brandenburg, in a double wedding alongside her uncle, the future king Frederick I of Denmark, and her sister-in-law Anna of Brandenburg. Elizabeth and Joachim got along quite well during the first twenty years of their marriage and co-existed harmoniously. She received her mother in 1507, attended her brother Christian's wedding in 1515 and received Christian in 1523.

Her spouse was a pugnacious adherent of Roman Catholic orthodoxy during the Reformation.  In 1523, she visited a sermon of Martin Luther with her brother and her sister-in-law and became a convinced Protestant. In 1527, she received the Protestant communion in public: this meant a public break with the Catholic Church, and caused a conflict with her husband. In 1528, her husband asked a clerical council from the Catholic Church if he should divorce, execute or isolate her if she refused to renounce her new conviction. The church council replied that he should have her imprisoned.

Elizabeth escaped to the court of her uncle, John, Elector of Saxony, and a public debate broke out: the Protestant monarchs and her brother supported her, Luther supported her freedom to leave her husband for her religion, and she declared that she would return only if she was allowed to keep her conviction and if her husband renounced his adultery and his interest in astrology. Otherwise, she suggested that they separate, referring to the separation of her own parents in 1504. She was given a residence near Wittenberg. Her husband refused to give her an allowance and forbade her sons to visit her. In 1532, her uncle died and her brother was imprisoned, and she thereby lost her supporters.

In 1535, her husband died and her sons asked her to return to Brandenburg, but changed their minds when she made the demand that the parishes in her dowry lands be made Protestant. She finally returned in 1545 and stayed in Spandau.

The marriage of her son Joachim II Hector, Elector of Brandenburg, to Hedwig Jagiellon did not satisfy Elizabeth. Catholic services were held for Hedwig in her private chapel, and the Dowager Electress was also unhappy because Hedwig could not speak German.

Issue 

Elizabeth's children were the following:

Joachim II Hector, Elector of Brandenburg
Anna (1507–1567), in 1524 married Albert VII, Duke of Mecklenburg-Güstrow,
Elisabeth (1510–1558), in 1525 married Eric I of Brunswick-Kalenberg,
Margaret (1511–1577), in 1530 married George I, Duke of Pomerania,
John (1513–1571), Margrave of Brandenburg-Küstrin.

Ancestry

References 

 http://www.kvinfo.dk/side/597/bio/795/origin/170/ (in Danish)

External links 

|-

1485 births
1555 deaths
15th-century Danish people
15th-century Norwegian people
15th-century Swedish people
16th-century Danish people
16th-century Norwegian people
16th-century Swedish people
15th-century Danish women
15th-century Swedish women
15th-century Norwegian women
16th-century Danish women
16th-century Swedish women
16th-century Norwegian women
16th-century German women
Danish princesses
Electresses of Brandenburg
House of Oldenburg in Denmark
Norwegian princesses
Swedish princesses
Daughters of kings